Public housing estates in Shek Kip Mei are public housing in an area originally known as Kap Shek Mi in New Kowloon on the North Eastern Kowloon Peninsula of Hong Kong.

History

Hong Kong's public housing program was initiated by Governor Alexander Grantham following a major fire on 25 December 1953. The Shek Kip Mei area was the location of tens of thousands of makeshift homes of immigrants from Mainland China. The fire cost many lives, and left 53,000 people homeless.

The public housing program introduced "multi story building" with fire- and flood-proof construction. The clearance of the fire debris and demolition of the remaining makeshift houses paved the way for construction of the Shek Kip Mei Low-cost Housing Estate (石硤尾廉租屋邨).

Overview

Chak On Estate

Chak On Estate is a public housing estate in Tai Wo Ping, Shek Kip Mei. Formerly Tai Wo Ping Cottage Area and built at a hill near Lung Cheung Road, the estate consists of 4 residential blocks completed in 1983.

Houses

Nam Shan Estate

Nam Shan Estate is a public housing estate in Shek Kip Mei, located near Tai Hang Tung Estate, Tai Hang Sai Estate and Yau Yat Tsuen. It was formerly called "Kowloon Tsai". It comprises 8 residential blocks built in 1977.

Houses

Pak Tin Estate

Pak Tin Estate is a public housing estate in Shek Kip Mei, located between Shek Kip Mei Estate and Chak On Estate. It is currently the largest public housing estate in Shek Kip Mei.

Shek Kip Mei Estate

Shek Kip Mei Estate (Chinese: 石硤尾邨) is the first public housing estate in Hong Kong. The estate was constructed as a result of a fire in Shek Kip Mei in 1953, to settle the families of inhabitants in the squats over the hill who lost their homes in one night.

Tai Hang Tung Estate

Tai Hang Tung Estate is a public housing estate in Shek Kip Mei, located near Tai Hang Sai Estate and Nam Shan Estate.

Tai Hang Sai Estate

Tai Hang Sai Estate is a private housing estate in Shek Kip Mei, located between Shek Kip Mei Estate and Tai Hang Tung Estate, near MTR Shek Kip Mei station. It consists of 8 residential buildings which were built in 1965 and 1977 respectively. The estate was built and managed by a privately owned company called "Hong Kong Settlers Housing Corporation Limited".

See also
 Public housing in Hong Kong
 List of public housing estates in Hong Kong

References

Shek Kip Mei
 

zh:澤安邨